Ingrid Larsen (later Sabroe; 12 July 1912 – 18 February 1997) was a Danish diver who competed in the 1932 Summer Olympics. She finished fifth in the 10 metre platform and eighth in the 3 metre springboard competition.

She married Povl Sabroe on 10 February 1945 with whom she had two sons.

References 

1912 births
1997 deaths
Danish female divers
Olympic divers of Denmark
Divers at the 1932 Summer Olympics
People from Langeland Municipality
Sportspeople from the Region of Southern Denmark